Wanxing Subdistrict is a subdistrict situated within Nankai District, Tianjin, China. It borders Changhong Subdistrict to the northwest, Guangkai and Xingnan Subdistricts to the north, Nanyingmen Subdistrict to the east, Xuefu Subdistrict to the south, and Jialing Avenue Subdistrict to the west. It had 140,684 residents as of 2010.

Its name Wanxing is a combination of the first characters of Wandezhuang and Xingyeli, two former subdistricts within the region.

Geography 
Wanxing subdistrict is located on the west of Weijin River, and is bypassed by the Jin River on the west.

History

Administrative divisions 
As of 2021, Wanxing Subdistrict was formed from 22 residential communities. They are, by the order of their Administrative Division Codes:

Gallery

References 

Township-level divisions of Tianjin
Nankai District, Tianjin